The Catholic Missionary Union can refer to:

Catholic Missionary Union of England and Wales founded in 1996
Apostolic Missionary Union which also known as the Catholic Missionary Union